Lieutenant General Bronisław Kwiatkowski (5 May 1950 in Mazury – 10 April 2010 in Smolensk) was a Polish military figure, Commander of the Polish Armed Forces Operational Command.  He was among the passengers killed in the 2010 Polish Air Force Tu-154 crash.

Awards and honours
He was awarded numerous civil and military awards including the Order of Polonia Restituta.
Commander's Cross of the Order of Polonia Restituta (2010, posthumously; previously awarded the Officer's Cross and the Knight's Cross)
Commander's Cross of the Order of the Military Cross
Gold Cross of Merit
Gold Medal of the Armed Forces in the Service of the Fatherland
Gold Medal of Merit for National Defence
Gold Medal for Long Service Award (2009)
Commemorative medal of the Multinational Division Central-South Iraq
Grand Officer of the Order of Merit (2008, Portugal)
UN Medal UNDOF mission
Instructor Parachute Badge

1950 births
2010 deaths
Polish generals
People from Kolbuszowa County
Victims of the Smolensk air disaster
Commanders of the Order of Polonia Restituta
Recipients of the Order of the Military Cross
Recipients of the Gold Cross of Merit (Poland)
Grand Officers of the Order of Merit (Portugal)
Burials at Salwator Cemetery